is a Japanese comedy manga series by Odeko Fujii. It has been serialized online via the website Curazy Manga since January 2018 and has been collected in three tankōbon volumes by Kadokawa Shoten. It is also available on Kadokawa Shoten's ComicWalker website. An original net animation (ONA) anime adaptation by Project No.9 premiered in January 2021, with a second season premiering in 2023.

Characters

Yoshine Fudō

Ray Okano

Mugaku Hamaoka

Yamada-san
Dokudakomaru

Media

Manga

Anime
An anime adaptation was announced by Odeko Fujii on September 30, 2020. It was later revealed to be an original net animation (ONA) in December 2020. The series was animated by Project No.9 and directed by Kazuya Iwata, with Satoru Sugizawa handling series' composition, Susumu Watanabe designing the characters, and H Zett M composing the series' music. It began streaming online on January 1, 2021 via the anime's official website and Twitter account. The opening theme song is  performed by Neko Hacker, featuring Najimu Mujina (Rina Hidaka), Mayu Warito (Hisako Kanemoto), Yuki Karuizawa (Sumire Uesaka) and Garcia Dekasegi (Sayaka Kaneko), while the ending theme song is  performed by Mayu Warito (Hisako Kanemoto), featuring Kotori Koiwai. Sentai Filmworks licensed the anime. They released it by editing all the episodes into one full-length episode.

On September 18, 2022, a second season titled Cute Executive Officer R was announced and the staff and cast will reprise their roles from the previous season. It will premiere in early 2023. The season's opening theme song will be  performed by Arisa Sonohara, while the ending theme song will be  performed by Neko Hacker.

Reception
In 2019, Cute Executive Officer was nominated for the 5th Next Manga Awards in the digital category and placed 20th out of 50 nominees.

Notes

References

External links
  
  
 

2021 anime ONAs
2023 anime ONAs
Anime series based on manga
Comedy anime and manga
Japanese webcomics
Kadokawa Dwango franchises
Kadokawa Shoten manga
Project No.9
Seinen manga
Sentai Filmworks
Webcomics in print
Workplace comics